Víkarbyrgi is a former village on the Faroese island of Suðuroy, Faroe Islands.

It no longer has a population. It retains a postal code (FO 928) and is located at N 61° 26' 34 W 6° 43' 28. The etymology of its name is reputed to be connected with an early settlement of Irish monks who predated the arrival of the Vikings. The last inhabitants had left Víkarbyrgi by 2003.

See also
 List of towns in the Faroe Islands

Further reading

External links
 The Tourist Information Center of Suðuroy

Former populated places in the Faroe Islands